José Eduardo Eugenio González Martínez del Río (born 14 April 1992), better known as José Eduardo Derbez, is a Mexican actor.

Biography 
José Eduardo Derbez is grandson of actress Silvia Derbez and nephew of the actress and presenter Gabriela Ruffo.

Filmography

Film

Television

References

External links 

1992 births
Mexican male telenovela actors
21st-century Mexican male actors
Male actors from Mexico City
Living people